The Australian Army Nursing Service (AANS) was an Australian Army Reserve unit which provided a pool of trained civilian nurses who had volunteered for military service during wartime. The AANS was formed in 1902 by amalgamating the nursing services of the colonial-era militaries, and formed part of the Australian Army Medical Corps. During World War I, more than 2,286 women joined the AANS AIF for overseas service. Many of them served in Casualty Clearing Stations. Hundreds more served in the AANS AMF on home service in Australia. After WWI, the AANS reverted to a Reserve. The AANS was mobilised again during World War II, and many of its members served overseas. Following the war several AANS nurses were posted to Japan as part of the British Commonwealth Occupation Force. The service was renamed the Royal Australian Army Nursing Service (RAANS) in November 1948 and became part of the regular Army the next year. In 1951 the RAANS achieved corps status, and became the Royal Australian Army Nursing Corps.

See also
Women in the Australian military
Royal Australian Air Force Nursing Service
The Other ANZACs, a history book by Peter Rees
ANZAC Girls, 6-part miniseries based on the book

References

Further reading

Nursing Service
Army medical administrative corps
Medical units and formations of Australia
Military nursing
Military units and formations established in 1902
Military units and formations disestablished in 1951